The People's Provincial Assembly (also known by its French acronym APW [short for Assemblée populaire de wilaya]) is the political body governing the provinces of Algeria. It is composed of an assembly elected on universal suffrage for five years. This assembly further elects a president, the president of the People's Provincial Assembly. The highest person in the administrative pyramid of the provinces is the Wāli, which is chosen by the president. The last votes for the PMAs and the PPAs were on November 27, 2021.

Politics of Algeria